2006 Lagos pipeline explosion may refer to:

 The 2006 Atlas Creek pipeline explosion, which occurred on May 12
 The 2006 Abule Egba pipeline explosion, which occurred on December 26